WKNC-FM (88.1 FM) is North Carolina State University's student-run, non-commercial college radio station broadcasting from Raleigh, North Carolina in the United States. Broadcasting with an effective radiated power of 25,000 watts, its signal covers much of the Research Triangle and outlying areas. The station is operated as part of the Department of Student Media at N.C. State and students hold all roles from DJ to general manager. The primary weekday format is indie rock, with specialty shows and other music genres featured during the evenings and weekends.

Programming
WKNC HD-1 and HD-2 are classified as a variety radio station by Nielsen Audio, providing block programming divided into four main formats: Daytime Rock (primarily indie rock), Afterhours (electronic), Underground (hip-hop), and Chainsaw Rock (heavy metal). The "Local Lunch" airs weekdays from 12 to 1 p.m. on HD-1 and from 1 to 2 p.m., during which only North Carolina artists are played.

Like many non-commercial stations, WKNC airs specialty shows including Geet Bazaar (South Asian music from India, Pakistan, Bangladesh, and others) and Both Kinds Radio (classic country and western swing). Other specialty music genres have included soul and R&B, A cappella, punk rock, post-rock, psychedelic, emo, jazz, Americana, classical music, ska, grunge, dance, funk, blues, K-pop, jam band and beach music.

WKNC produces a weekly public affairs show called "Eye on the Triangle," which focuses on current events and culture in the Research Triangle. The station also broadcasts all NC State Wolfpack women's basketball games and NC State Wolfpack baseball from Learfield IMG College.

Audio podcasts of "Eye on the Triangle," WKNC interviews and other podcasts are available via iTunes, Spotify and everywhere else podcasts are found.

Each year since 2004, WKNC also holds a benefit concert named the Double Barrel Benefit. The two-night concert series bring in North Carolina based bands in order to raise additional funds for the station.

History

WLAC (1922–1923) 
 August 31, 1922 – WLAC-AM at North Carolina State College became the third radio station licensed in North Carolina.
 October 16, 1922 – WLAC's first broadcast featured guest speaker Josephus Daniels, former secretary of the U.S. Navy and owner of the Raleigh News & Observer. Daniels predicts: "Nobody now fears that a Japanese fleet could deal an unexpected blow on our Pacific possessions...Radio makes surprises impossible."
 October 29, 1923 – WLAC was removed from the FCC records when their license was not renewed.

WOLF/WNCS (1944–1947) 
 January 1944 – A group of engineering students, led by Harris Wroton, establish WOLF (the mascot of NC State is the Wolfpack) as a carrier current station for on-campus listeners.
 1945 – The station's call letters were changed to WNCS (W-North Carolina State) 570 AM
 November 1946 – WNCS is recognized by the Student Publications Authority. With university support, a permanent home for the station was established on campus.

WVWP (1947–1958) 
 Summer 1947 – The call letters were changed again to WVWP (W-Voice of the Wolf Pack) 580 AM.
 1948  – WVWP broadcasts all home men's basketball games from Frank Thompson Gymnasium.
 Fall 1951 – WVWP adds a second transmitter at 560 AM.
 April 1952 – FCC shut down WVWP's transmitter at 560 AM for signal over-radiation.
 March 1954 – WVWP broadcasts the first ACC basketball tournament from NC State's Reynolds Coliseum.

WKNC-AM (1958–1966) 
 
 Summer 1958 – A final call letter change from WVWP to WKNC 580 AM.
 December 1959 – WKNC installs a satellite transmitter at Peace College in Raleigh
 February 1960 – WKNC and WDBS at Duke University form intercollegiate radio network. The two stations worked together to broadcast coverage of the Republication State Convention in Raleigh. 
 December 1960 – WKNC develops a rudimentary automation system that allows up to five hours of pre-recorded broadcasting
 1962 – WKNC and the other student publications move their offices from the 1911 Building to the basement of the King Religious Center (formerly the YMCA Building). The building was torn down in 1975.
 November 1963 – WKNC moves from 580 AM to 600 AM.
 February 1964 – The Student Publications Board votes to change the positions of Technician and Agromeck editor and WKNC manager from elected to being hired by the Student Publications Board

WKNC-FM/WPAK-AM (1966–1971) 
 October 9, 1966 – WKNC 580 AM became WKNC 88.1 FM. The 10-watt transmitter expanded the coverage area from on-campus residence halls to much of the surrounding city. WKNC aired a mix of folk, jazz, and classical music at the time.
 April 1, 1968 – After a student survey showed only about half of students had an FM radio, WPAK signs on at 600 AM. WPAK was on the air until 1971.
 1970 – WKNC begins airing Wolfpack baseball on 88.1 FM.
 November 1970 – WKNC expands broadcasting day to 20.5 hours Monday through Friday, beginning at 9 a.m. “Through the addition of a simple automation system, we are now able to broadcast between the hours of 9 a.m. and 6 p.m. in addition to our regular schedule,” General Manager Fred Plunkett told the Technician.

WKNC-FM (1972–2015) 
 Summer 1972 – Student publications offices, including Technician, Agromeck and WKNC-FM, move to new University Student Center (now called Talley Student Union). A tower for WKNC wat built at of D.H. Hill Library, expanding reception of the station to around 25 miles.
 January 1974 – WKNC launches “The Music Makers”, a locally produced 10-week series was hosted by Robert Starling.  Starling told the technician the program would “try to bring out the things people don’t know about [local] musicians.” 
 November 1976 – WKNC forms North Carolina University Radio Network. Approximately 30 students from WKNC, WSHA at Shaw University, WUAG at University of North Carolina at Greensboro, WECU at East Carolina University, and WASU at Appalachian State University worked together to provide election results throughout the evening.
 1976–1977 – Transmitter power increased to 1,000 watts. Format changed to a progressive rock style, but continued to feature top-40, jazz, and soul.
 November 1979 – WKNC broadcasts its first women's basketball game.
 early 1980s – The station known as Rock 88, moved into a hard rock/heavy metal format and gained praise as one of the top college stations in the nation.
 1981 – WKNC launches paid sponsorship. Early underwriters included University Food Services and Silver Bullet Saloon.
 1984 – Effective Radiated Power increased from 1,000 to 3,000 watts, expanding coverage to a 40-mile radius. An 80-foot self-supporting tower replaced the guyed mast.
 March 9, 1991 – WKNC signs on from its new facilities in the Student Center Annex (later named the Witherspoon Student Center).
 April 1998 – The format changed from a hard rock format to a wider blend of music focusing on independent and non-top-40 artists.
 August 1998 – WKNC began its webcast.
 October 2003 – Effective Radiated Power increased to 25,000 watts, making WKNC one of the top 10 college radio stations in America in terms of wattage and signal reach.
 January 16–17, 2004 – The first Double Barrel Benefit fundraiser takes place.
 April 1, 2007 – WKNC launches its first podcast, "88.1 Seconds of Technician" in partnership with Technician newspaper.
 September 2009 – WKNC launches its Fridays on the Lawn on-campus concert series.
 2010 – WKNC launches its first podcast exclusive program “SoundOff.”
 2013 – WKNC launches “WKNC’s The Lounge” YouTube channel.
 2015 – February 2015 – WKNC publishes its first zine, “Bad Words (And Other Things You Can’t Say on the Radio).”

WKNC-FM HD-1/HD-2 (2016–present) 
 2016 – WKNC reconfigures its antenna pattern to increase the signal coverage and expands non-indie rock programming.
 October 9, 2016 – Broadcasting begins in HD Radio to commemorate the station's 50th anniversary at 88.1 FM.
 January 9, 2019 – WKNC launches an HD-2 subchannel with heavy metal, hip-hop and electronic music programmed during daytime hours.
 May 3, 2019 – WolfBytes Radio begins leasing WKNC's HD-3 subchannel, programming a dance music format.

Notable alumni
 John Tesh, nationally syndicated radio host, TV host and musician
 Zach Galifianakis, actor and comedian
 John Davis, host of public television program MotorWeek

References

External links
 

KNC-FM
North Carolina State University
Radio stations established in 1966